The Ligue Européenne de Natation LEN is the governing body for Water polo in Europe. It organises Three main Active club competitions : the LEN Champions League (formerly European Cup), the LEN Euro Cup, and the LEN Super Cup. there is also a former LEN club competition such as the LEN Cup Winners' Cup Existed between the years 1974 to 2003.
The Italian side Pro Recco have won a record total of 17 titles in LEN Europe club competitions, Four more than HAVK Mladost from Croatia.

The Italian clubs have won the most titles (44), ahead of clubs from Hungary (31).

Winners

By club

The following table lists all the men's clubs that have won at least one LEN Europe club competition, and is updated as of June 04, 2022 (in chronological order).

Key

By country
The following table lists all the countries whose clubs have won at least one LEN competition, and is updated as of June 04, 2022 (in chronological order).

References

Notes

External links
LEN Official Website.

+
Water polo-related lists